Confessio catholica is one of the main works of German Orthodox Lutheran theologian Johann Gerhard (1582–1637). It seeks to prove the evangelical and catholic character of the doctrine of the Augsburg Confession from the writings of approved Roman Catholic authors.

Confessio catholica, in qua doctrina catholica et evangelica, quam ecclesiae Augustanae confessioni addictae profilentur, ex Romano-catholicorum scriptorum suffragiis confirmatur (4 parts, Frankfort and Leipsic, 1634–37), is based upon the Catalogus testium veritatis of Flacius. It is more comprehensive than its title denotes, being at the same time an extensive apology and polemic of
the Evangelical Creed. The first part is general and treats the principia et media nostrae et pontificiae religionis. The other three volumes treat the disputed articles of faith in the order of
Bellarmine, the controversialist par excellence. Its contents may be compared with Gerhard's Theological Commonplaces: On the Church, an earlier handling with many themes in common with the Confessio Catholica.

References
 
Bengt Hägglund: Polemics and Dialogue in John Gerhard's Confessio catholica. LUTHERAN QUARTERLY Summer 2000 Issue.

External links
 Confessio Catholica (Frankfurt, 1679), Single volume edition.
 Confessio Catholica (Jena, 1634), volume 1: Introductory volume
 Confessio Catholica (Jena, 1634), volume 2/1: On the Word of God, Christ, the Roman Pontiff, councils, and the Church
 Confessio Catholica (Jena, 1636), volume 2/2: On clergy, monks, laity, purgatory, saints, sacraments, Baptism, confirmation, Eucharist, and the Mass
 Confessio Catholica (Jena, 1637), volume 2/3: On penance, extreme unction, sacrament of order, matrimony, the grace of the first man, sin, grace and free choice, justification, and good works

1634 books
1636 books
1637 books
Lutheran texts
17th-century Christian texts